Kalika Mata Temple may refer to:

 Kalika Mata Temple, Chittorgarh Fort, in Rajasthan state, India
 Kalika Mata Temple, Pavagadh, in Gujarat state, India
 Kalika Mata Temple, Old Dhrewad, in Gujarat state, India